The Cocoparra National Park is a protected national park that is located in the Riverina region of New South Wales, in eastern Australia. The name of the park comes from the Aboriginal ''cocupara'’, or kookaburra.

Features
Adjoining the national park to the north is the Cocoparra Nature Reserve. The national park was gazetted in December 1969. The Binya-Cocoparra area is classified by BirdLife International as an Important Bird Area because of its relatively large population (of up to 50 individuals) of the near threatened painted honeyeater, as well as the diamond firetail.

The rugged, robust landscape of the park provides a large number of different habitats.

The climate is semi arid. The vegetation communities reflect this, with wattle, orchids, ironbark and blue-tinged cypress pines.

The geology comprises Upper Devonian sandstones, siltsones and conglomerates.

There are a number of day use (picnic) areas in the park and a campground at Woolshed Flat.

See also

 Protected areas of New South Wales
 List of national parks of Australia

References

External links
NSW Parks and Wildlife Service Cocoparra National Park website
Online version of Cocoparra National Park Management Plan

National parks of New South Wales
Protected areas established in 1969
1969 establishments in Australia
Important Bird Areas of New South Wales
Riverina